Patrick Joseph Buchanan (born November 2, 1938) is an American paleoconservative author, political commentator, columnist, politician, and broadcaster. Buchanan was an assistant and special consultant to U.S. Presidents Richard Nixon, Gerald Ford, and Ronald Reagan. He is a major figure in the modern paleoconservative movement in America, and his writings, morals, values, and thinking have continued to influence many paleoconservatives.

In 1992 and 1996, he sought the Republican presidential nomination. In 1992 he ran against incumbent president George H. W. Bush, campaigning against Bush's breaking of his "Read my lips: no new taxes" pledge, as well as his foreign policy and positions on social issues. At the 1992 Republican National Convention, Buchanan delivered his "Culture War" speech in support of the nominated President Bush. In 1996, he ran against eventual Republican nominee Bob Dole, but withdrew after getting only 21 percent of Republican primary votes. In 2000, he was the Reform Party's presidential nominee. His campaign centered on non-interventionism in foreign affairs, opposition to illegal immigration, and opposition to the outsourcing of manufacturing from free trade. He selected educator and conservative activist Ezola Foster as his running-mate.

In 2002, he co-founded The American Conservative magazine and launched a foundation named The American Cause. He has been published in The Occidental Observer, Human Events, National Review, The Nation, and Rolling Stone. The original host on CNN's Crossfire, he was a political commentator on the MSNBC cable network, including the show Morning Joe until February 2012, later appearing on Fox News. Buchanan was also a regular panelist on The McLaughlin Group. His political positions can basically be summed up as paleoconservative, and many of his views, particularly his opposition to American imperialism and the managerial state, echo those of the Old Right Republicans of the first half of the 20th century. Since 2006, Buchanan has been a frequent contributor to VDARE.

Early life
Buchanan was born in Washington, D.C., a son of William Baldwin Buchanan (August 13, 1905, in Virginia – January 19, 1988 in Washington, D.C.), a partner in an accounting firm, and his wife Catherine Elizabeth (Crum) Buchanan (December 23, 1911, in Charleroi, Washington County, Pennsylvania – September 18, 1995, in Oakton, Fairfax County, Virginia), a nurse and a homemaker. Buchanan had six brothers (Brian, Henry, James, John, Thomas, and William Jr.) and two sisters (Kathleen Theresa and Angela Marie, nicknamed Bay). Bay served as U.S. Treasurer under Ronald Reagan. His father was of Irish, English, and Scottish ancestry, and his mother was of German descent. He had a great-grandfather who fought in the American Civil War in the Confederate States Army, which is why he is a member of the Sons of Confederate Veterans. He admires Robert E. Lee, Douglas MacArthur and Joseph McCarthy.

Of his Southern ancestry, Buchanan has written:

Buchanan was born into a Catholic family and attended Catholic schools, including the Jesuit-run Gonzaga College High School. As a student at a Catholic college—Georgetown University—he was in the Reserve Officers' Training Corps (ROTC) but did not complete the program. He earned his bachelor's degree in English from Georgetown, and received his draft notice after he graduated in 1960. The District of Columbia draft board exempted Buchanan from military service because of reactive arthritis, classifying him as 4-F. He received a master's degree in journalism from Columbia University in 1962, writing his thesis on the expanding trade between Canada and Cuba.

Career

St. Louis Globe-Democrat editorial writer
Buchanan joined the St. Louis Globe-Democrat at age 23. During the first year of the United States embargo against Cuba in 1961, Canada–Cuba trade tripled. The Globe-Democrat published a rewrite of Buchanan's Columbia master's project under the eight-column banner "Canada sells to Red Cuba — And Prospers" eight weeks after Buchanan started at the paper. According to Buchanan's memoir Right from the Beginning, this article was a career milestone. Buchanan later said the embargo strengthened the communist regime and he turned against it. Buchanan was promoted to assistant editorial page editor in 1964 and supported Barry Goldwater's presidential campaign. The Globe-Democrat did not endorse Goldwater, and Buchanan speculated there was a clandestine agreement between the paper and President Lyndon B. Johnson. Buchanan recalled: "The conservative movement has always advanced from its defeats ... I can't think of a single conservative who was sorry about the Goldwater campaign." According to the foreword (written by Pat Buchanan) in some editions of Goldwater's Conscience of a Conservative, Buchanan was a member of the Young Americans for Freedom and wrote press releases for that organization. He served as an executive assistant in the Nixon, Mudge, Rose, Guthrie, Alexander, and Mitchell law offices in New York City in 1965.

Work for the Nixon White House

The next year, he was the first adviser hired by Nixon's presidential campaign; he worked primarily as an opposition researcher. The highly partisan speeches Buchanan wrote were consciously aimed at Richard Nixon's dedicated supporters, for which his colleagues soon nicknamed him Mr. Inside. Buchanan traveled with Nixon throughout the campaigns of 1966 and 1968. He made a tour of Western Europe, Africa and, in the immediate aftermath of the Six-Day War, the Middle East.

During the course of Nixon's presidency, Buchanan became entrusted on press relations, policy positions, and political strategy. Early on during Nixon's presidency, Buchanan worked as a White House assistant and speechwriter for Nixon and Vice President Spiro Agnew. Buchanan coined the phrase "Silent Majority," and helped shape the strategy that drew millions of Democrats to Nixon. In a 1972 memo, he suggested the White House "should move to re-capture the anti-Establishment tradition or theme in American politics." His daily assignments included developing political strategy, publishing the President's Daily News Summary, and preparing briefing books for news conferences. He accompanied Nixon on his trip to China in 1972 and the summit in Moscow, Yalta and Minsk in 1974. He suggested that Nixon label Democratic opponent George McGovern an extremist and burn the White House tapes. Buchanan later argued that Nixon would have survived the Watergate scandal with his reputation intact if he had burnt the tapes.

Buchanan remained as a special assistant to Nixon through the final days of the Watergate scandal. He was not accused of wrongdoing, though some mistakenly suspected him of being Deep Throat. In 2005 when the actual identity of the press leak was revealed as Federal Bureau of Investigation Associate Director Mark Felt, Buchanan called him "sneaky," "dishonest" and "criminal." Because of his role in the Nixon campaign's "attack group," Buchanan appeared before the Senate Watergate Committee on September 26, 1973. He told the panel: "The mandate that the American people gave to this president and his administration cannot, and will not, be frustrated or repealed or overthrown as a consequence of the incumbent tragedy".

When Nixon resigned in 1974, Buchanan briefly stayed on as special assistant under incoming President Gerald Ford. Chief of Staff Alexander Haig offered Buchanan his choice of three open ambassador posts, including South Africa, for which Buchanan opted. President Ford initially signed off on the appointment, but then rescinded it after it was prematurely reported in the Evans-Novak Political Report and caused controversy, especially among the U.S. diplomatic corps.

Buchanan remarked about Watergate: "The lost opportunity to move against the political forces frustrating the expressed national will ... To effect a political counterrevolution in the capital— ... there is no substitute for a principled and dedicated man of the Right in the Oval Office".

Long after his resignation, Nixon called Buchanan a confidant and said he was neither a racist nor an antisemite nor a bigot or "hater," but a "decent, patriotic American." Nixon said Buchanan had "some strong views," such as his "isolationist" foreign policy, with which he disagreed. While Nixon did not think Buchanan should become president, he said the commentator "should be heard." However, according to a memo President Nixon sent to John Ehrlichman in 1970, Nixon characterized Buchanan's attitude towards integration as "segregation forever". Following Nixon's re-election in 1972, Buchanan himself had written in a memo to Nixon suggesting he should not "fritter away his present high support in the nation for an ill-advised governmental effort to forcibly integrate races."

News commentator
Buchanan returned to his column and began regular appearances as a broadcast host and political commentator. He co-hosted a three-hour daily radio show with liberal columnist Tom Braden called the Buchanan-Braden Program. He delivered daily commentaries on NBC radio from 1978 to 1984. Buchanan started his TV career as a regular on The McLaughlin Group and CNN's Crossfire (inspired by Buchanan-Braden) and The Capital Gang, making him nationally recognizable. His several stints on Crossfire occurred between 1982 and 1999; his sparring partners included Braden, Michael Kinsley, Geraldine Ferraro, and Bill Press.

Buchanan was a regular panelist on The McLaughlin Group. He appeared most Sundays alongside John McLaughlin and the more liberal Newsweek journalist Eleanor Clift. His columns are syndicated nationally by Creators Syndicate.

Work for the Reagan White House

Buchanan served as White House Communications Director from February 1985 to March 1987. 
In a speech to the National Religious Broadcasters in 1986, Buchanan said of the Reagan administration: "Whether President Reagan has charted a new course that will set our compass for decadesor whether history will see him as the conservative interruption in a process of inexorable national declineis yet to be determined".

A year later, he remarked that "the greatest vacuum in American politics is to the right of Ronald Reagan." While her brother was working for Reagan, Bay Buchanan started a "Buchanan for President" movement in June 1986. She said the conservative movement needed a leader, but Buchanan was initially ambivalent. After leaving the White House, he returned to his column and Crossfire. Out of respect for Jack Kemp he sat out the 1988 race, although Kemp later became his adversary.

Political campaigns

1992 presidential primaries

Buchanan was highly critical of the foreign and economic policies of the George H.W. Bush administration, particularly Bush's breaking of his 1988 "Read my lips: no new taxes" pledge. In 1990, Buchanan published a newsletter called Patrick J. Buchanan: From the Right; it sent subscribers a bumper sticker reading: "Read Our Lips! No new taxes." In the 1992 Republican Party presidential primaries, Buchanan challenged Bush in his bid for re-nomination by the Republican Party. Buchanan failed to win any primaries, but finished a strong second in the New Hampshire primary and was regarded as forcing Bush to walk back his economic policies. The Buchanan campaign ran a number of radio and TV spots criticizing Bush's policies; in one, Buchanan accused Bush of being a "trade wimp", while another attacked him for presiding over the National Endowment of the Arts, which he said "invested our tax dollars in pornographic and blasphemous art too shocking to show."

In 1992, Buchanan explained his reasons for challenging the incumbent, President George H. W. Bush:

He ran on a platform of immigration reduction and social conservatism, including opposition to multiculturalism, abortion, and gay rights. Buchanan challenged Bush (whose popularity was waning) when he won 38% of the New Hampshire primary. In the primary elections, Buchanan garnered three million total votes or 23% of the vote.

Buchanan later threw his support behind Bush and delivered an address at the 1992 Republican National Convention, which became known as the culture war speech, in which he described "a religious war going on in our country for the soul of America." In the speech, he said of Bill and Hillary Clinton:

Buchanan also said, in reference to the then recently held 1992 Democratic National Convention, "Like many of you last month, I watched that giant masquerade ball at Madison Square Garden—where 20,000 radicals and liberals came dressed up as moderates and centrists—in the greatest single exhibition of cross-dressing in American political history."

The contents of Buchanan's speech prompted his detractors to claim that the speech alienated moderate voters from the Bush-Quayle ticket. The newspaper columnist Molly Ivins wrote: "Many people did not care for Pat Buchanan's speech; it probably sounded better in the original German."

Off the campaign trail
Buchanan returned to his column and Crossfire. To promote the principles of federalism, traditional values, and anti-intervention, he founded The American Cause, a conservative educational foundation, in 1993. Bay Buchanan serves as the Vienna, VA-based foundation's president and Pat is its chairman.

Buchanan returned to radio as host of Buchanan and Company, a three-hour talk show for Mutual Broadcasting System on July 5, 1993. It pitted him against liberal co-hosts, including Barry Lynn, Bob Beckel, and Chris Matthews, in a time slot opposite Rush Limbaugh's show. To launch his 1996 campaign, Buchanan left the program on March 20, 1995.

1996 presidential primaries

Buchanan made another attempt to win the Republican nomination in the 1996 primaries. Democratic President Bill Clinton was seeking reelection, but Clinton's predecessor President George H.W. Bush made clear he was uninterested in regaining the office. The party's front-runner was Sen. Bob Dole of Kansas, the Senate Majority Leader, who was considered to have many weaknesses.

Buchanan contested the Republican nomination from Dole's right, voicing his opposition to the North American Free Trade Agreement (NAFTA). Other candidates for the nomination included Sen. Phil Gramm of Texas, former Tennessee Governor Lamar Alexander and multi-millionaire publisher Steve Forbes.

In February, the liberal Center for Public Integrity issued a report claiming Buchanan's presidential campaign co-chairman, Larry Pratt, appeared at two meetings organized by white supremacist and militia leaders. Pratt denied any tie to racism, calling the report an orchestrated smear before the New Hampshire primary. Buchanan told the conservative Manchester Union Leader he believed Pratt. Pratt took a leave of absence "to answer these charges," "so as not to have distraction in the campaign."

Buchanan defeated Dole by about 3,000 votes, bettering his 1992 second-place finish in the February New Hampshire primary. He was endorsed by conservative Phyllis Schlafly, among others. He won three other states (Alaska, Missouri, and Louisiana), and finished only slightly behind Dole in the Iowa caucus. His insurgent campaign used his soaring rhetoric to mobilize grass-roots right wing opinion against what he saw as the bland Washington establishment (personified by Dole) which he believed had controlled the party for years. At a rally later in Nashua, he said:

 
In the Super Tuesday primaries Dole defeated Buchanan by large margins. Having collected only 21%, or 3.1 million, of the total votes in Republican primaries, Buchanan suspended his campaign in March. He declared that, if Dole were to choose a pro-choice running mate, he would run as the US Taxpayers Party (now Constitution Party) candidate. Dole chose Jack Kemp, and he received Buchanan's endorsement. After the 1996 campaign, Buchanan returned to his column and Crossfire. He also began a series of books with 1998's The Great Betrayal.

2000 presidential campaign

Buchanan announced his departure from the Republican Party in October 1999, disparaging them (along with the Democrats) as a "beltway party." He sought the nomination of the Reform Party. Many reformers backed Iowa physicist John Hagelin, whose platform was based on Transcendental Meditation. Party founder Ross Perot did not endorse either candidate for the Reform Party's nomination. (In late October 2000, Perot publicly endorsed George W. Bush, but Perot's 1996 running-mate, Pat Choate, would go on to endorse Buchanan.)

Supporters of Hagelin charged the results of the party's open primary, which favored Buchanan by a wide margin, were "tainted." The Reform Party divisions led to dual conventions being held simultaneously in separate areas of the Long Beach Convention Center complex. Both conventions' delegates ignored the primary ballots and voted to nominate their presidential candidates from the floor, similar to the Democratic and Republican conventions. One convention nominated Buchanan while the other backed Hagelin, with each camp claiming to be the legitimate Reform Party.

Ultimately, when the Federal Elections Commission ruled Buchanan was to receive ballot status as the Reform candidate, as well as about $12.6 million in federal campaign funds secured by Perot's showing in the 1996 election, Buchanan won the nomination. In his acceptance speech, Buchanan proposed US withdrawal from the United Nations and expelling the United Nations Headquarters from New York, abolishing the Internal Revenue Service, Department of Education, Department of Energy, Department of Housing and Urban Development, taxes on inheritance and capital gains, and affirmative action programs.

As his running mate, Buchanan chose African American activist and retired teacher from Los Angeles, Ezola B. Foster. Buchanan was supported in this election run by future Socialist Party USA presidential candidate Brian Moore, who said in 2008 he supported Buchanan in 2000 because "he was for fair trade over free trade. He had some progressive positions that I thought would be helpful to the common man." On August 19, the New York Right to Life Party, in convention, chose Buchanan as their nominee, with 90% of the districts voting for him.

In a campaign speech at Bob Jones University in Greenville, South Carolina, Buchanan attempted to rally his conservative base:

In the 2000 presidential election, Buchanan finished fourth with 449,895 votes, 0.4% of the popular vote. (Hagelin garnered 0.1% as the Natural Law Party candidate.) In Palm Beach County, Florida, Buchanan received 3,407 voteswhich some saw as inconsistent with Palm Beach County's liberal leanings, its large Jewish population and his showing in the rest of the state. As a result of the county's now-infamous "butterfly ballot", he is suspected to have gained close to 3000 inadvertent votes. Bush spokesman Ari Fleischer stated, "Palm Beach county is a Pat Buchanan stronghold and that's why Pat Buchanan received 3,407 votes there." Reform Party officials strongly disagreed, estimating the number of supporters in the county at between 400 and 500. Appearing on The Today Show, Buchanan said: "When I took one look at that ballot on Election Night ... it's very easy for me to see how someone could have voted for me in the belief they voted for Al Gore".

Some observers said his campaign was aimed to spread his message beyond his white conservative and populist base, while his views had not changed.

Later presidential elections
Following the 2000 election, Reform Party members urged Buchanan to take an active role within the party. Buchanan declined, though he did attend their 2001 convention. In the next few years, he identified himself as a political independent, choosing not to align himself with what he viewed as the neo-conservative Republican party leadership. Prior to the 2004 election, Buchanan announced he once again identified himself as a Republican, declared that he had no interest in ever running for president again, and reluctantly endorsed Bush's 2004 reelection, writing: "Bush is right on taxes, judges, sovereignty, and values. Kerry is right on nothing".

Buchanan also endorsed Republican presidential candidate Mitt Romney in 2012, stating in an article that "Obama offers more of the stalemate America has gone through for the past two years" while "Romney alone offers a possibility of hope and change."

Buchanan supported the nomination of Donald Trump, who ran on many of the same positions that Buchanan ran on twenty years prior, as Republican presidential candidate for the 2016 presidential election.

Later media activities

MSNBC commentator

Although CNN decided not to take him back, Buchanan's column resumed. A longer variation of the Crossfire format was aired by MSNBC as Buchanan and Press on July 15, 2002, reuniting Buchanan and Press. Billed as "the smartest hour on television", Buchanan and Press featured the duo interviewing guests and sparring about the top news stories. As the Iraq War loomed, Buchanan and Press toned down their rivalry, as they both opposed the invasion. Press claims they were the first cable hosts to discuss the planned attack. MSNBC Editor-in-Chief Jerry Nachman once jokingly lamented this unusual situation:

Just hours after his talk show debuted, Buchanan was a guest on the premiere of MSNBC's short-lived Donahue program. Host Phil Donahue and Buchanan debated the separation of church and state. Buchanan called Donahue "dictatorial" and said that the host got his job through affirmative action.

MSNBC President Eric Sorenson canceled Buchanan and Press on November 26, 2003. Buchanan stayed at MSNBC as a political analyst. He regularly appeared on the network's talk shows. He occasionally filled in on the nightly show Scarborough Country during its run on MSNBC. Buchanan also was a frequent guest and co-host of Morning Joe as well as Hardball and The Rachel Maddow Show.

In September 2009, Buchanan wrote an MSNBC opinion column defending Adolf Hitler. The article was removed from the website after MSNBC was urged to do so in a public statement by the National Jewish Democratic Council. Buchanan had used the occasion of the 70th anniversary of the German invasion of Poland to argue that the United Kingdom should not have declared war on Nazi Germany. This revived charges of antisemitism and helping to legitimize Holocaust denial.

In October 2011, Buchanan was indefinitely suspended from MSNBC as a contributor after the publication of his book Suicide of a Superpower. One of the book's chapters is titled, "The End of White America." The minority advocacy group Color of Change had urged MSNBC to fire him over alleged racist slurs. It was announced on February 16, 2012, that MSNBC's connection with Buchanan had ended.

The American Conservative magazine

In 2002, Buchanan partnered with former New York Post editorial page editor Scott McConnell and journalist Taki Theodoracopulos to found The American Conservative, a new magazine intended to promote traditional conservative viewpoints on economic, immigration and foreign policies. The first issue was dated October 7, 2002.

VDARE 
Since 2006, Buchanan has been a frequent contributor to VDARE, a far right website and blog founded by anti-immigration activist and paleo-conservative Peter Brimelow. VDARE is considered a white nationalist news source by the Southern Poverty Law Center.

Accusations of antisemitism and Holocaust denial
In December 1991, a 40,000-word article by William F. Buckley Jr. was published in the National Review discussing antisemitism among conservative commentators focused largely on Buchanan; the article and many responses to it were collected in the book In Search of Anti-Semitism (1992). He wrote: "I find it impossible to defend Pat Buchanan against the charge that what he did and said during the period under examination amounted to anti-Semitism", but concluded: "If you ask, do I think Pat Buchanan is an anti-Semite, my answer is he is not one. But I think he's said some anti-Semitic things".

The Anti-Defamation League has described Buchanan as an "unrepentant bigot" who "repeatedly demonizes Jews and minorities and openly affiliates with white supremacists." In an article for The Washington Post in March 1992, conservative columnist Charles Krauthammer suggested: "The real problem with Buchanan ... is not that his instincts are antisemitic but that they are, in various and distinct ways, fascistic." "There's no doubt," said Krauthammer in 1999 when contacted for a Salon article, "he makes subliminal appeals to prejudice." He added: "The interesting thing is how he can say these things and still be considered a national figure." Buchanan denies assertions that he is an antisemite, and some of his fellow journalists, including Murray Rothbard, Jack Germond, Al Hunt and Mark Shields, have defended him against the charge.

Nazi war criminals
Around 1982, Buchanan began to defend Cleveland auto-worker John Demjanjuk against the charge that Demjanjuk was a Nazi war criminal nicknamed "Ivan the Terrible" responsible for the mass murder of Jews at Treblinka. In 1986, while he was a senior figure in the Reagan administration, he was highly critical of the charges brought by Office of Special Investigations (OSI), the Nazi war crimes unit of the Justice Department. He claimed Demjanjuk was the victim of mistaken identity and possibly the victim of a plot by the Soviet Union.

The following year, while still a member of the administration, he made unofficial attempts to stop the deportation of suspected Nazi war criminals from the Eastern Bloc, including Estonian Karl Linnas as well as Demjanjuk. Menachem Z. Rosensaft, in a New York Times op-ed, described Buchanan's "oft-expressed sympathy for a host of Nazi criminals" like Linnas as being "a constitutionally protected perversion." Buchanan referred to such cases as being pursued by "revenge-obsessed Nazi hunters" in 1987. As a member of the Reagan White House, he was accused of having suppressed the Reagan Justice Department's investigation into Nazi scientists brought to America by the OSS's Operation Paperclip.

In 1990, Allan Ryan Jr., a former head of the OSI said Buchanan's accusation of KGB involvement in the Demjanjuk case was "an absolutely cockamamie theory." Ryan accused Buchanan of being "the spokesman for Nazi war criminals in America." Neal Sher, OSI head in 1990 said Buchanan had never contacted them, even when he was a government official. "He essentially took what was fed him by our opponents, sometimes Holocaust-deniers, and just regurgitated it," Sher told The Washington Post.

In 2009, Menachem Z. Rosensaft in The Times of Israel and Jeffrey Goldberg in The Atlantic, objected to Buchanan in his syndicated column comparing Demjanjuk to Jesus Christ and Buchanan calling him an "American Dreyfuss." It was viewed by Goldberg as an example of the libel that the Jews as a whole killed Christ. Describing Buchanan's comparison as "strikingly offensive" and an attempt to "revive the charge of blood libel" against Jews, Peter Wehner wrote in Commentary magazine: "Rarely do you find such an obscene mix of blasphemy and bigotry, and all in less than 900 words." The former guard had been deported to Germany, where he was convicted of being an accessory to the murder of 28,000 Jews at the Sobibor extermination camp.

Bitburg visit by President Reagan
Buchanan supported President Reagan's plan to visit a German military cemetery at Bitburg in 1985, where among buried Wehrmacht soldiers were the graves of 48 Waffen SS members. At the insistence of German Chancellor Helmut Kohl and over the vocal objections of Jewish groups, the trip went ahead. In a 1992 interview, Elie Wiesel described attending a White House meeting of Jewish leaders about the trip: "The only one really defending the trip was Pat Buchanan, saying, 'We cannot give the perception of the President being subjected to Jewish pressure.'" Buchanan accused Wiesel of fabricating the story in an ABC interview in 1992: "I didn't say it and Elie Wiesel wasn't even in the meeting ... That meeting was held three weeks before the Bitburg summit was held. If I had said that, it would have been out of there within hours and on the news."

Comments on the Holocaust
In a 1990 column for the New York Post, Buchanan wrote that it was impossible for 850,000 Jews to be killed by diesel exhaust fed into the gas chamber at Treblinka in a return to his interest in the Demjanjuk case. "Diesel engines do not emit enough carbon monoxide to kill anybody," he wrote. The Washington Post cited experts to the effect that there is more than sufficient carbon monoxide present in the fumes to speedily asphyxiate victims, causing their death. Buchanan once argued Treblinka "was not a death camp but a transit camp used as a 'pass-through point' for prisoners". In fact, historians have estimated that some 900,000 Jews were murdered at Treblinka. When George Will challenged him on the issue on TV in December 1991, Buchanan did not reply.

Comments about Israel
In the context of the Gulf War, on August 26, 1990, Buchanan appeared on The McLaughlin Group and said: "there are only two groups that are beating the drums for war in the Middle East – the Israeli defense ministry and its 'amen corner' in the United States." Buchanan on The McLaughlin Group on June 15, 1990, asserted: "Capitol Hill is Israeli occupied territory". He also said in the August 1990 program: "The Israelis want this war desperately because they want the United States to destroy the Iraqi war machine. They want us to finish them off. They don't care about our relations with the Arab world." A. M. Rosenthal, in an article for The New York Times explicitly accused Buchanan of antisemitism on the grounds that he had used the word "Israelis" as a cover for Jews. Abraham Foxman, the director of the ADL, compared Buchanan's comments to insinuations made during the Second World War "that Jews were the only ones who sought American entry in the war against Nazi Germany".

Holocaust survivor Elie Wiesel in September 1990 said Buchanan "leaves the memory of Jewish victims in such disdain; a man who always takes the side of those accused of being killers; a man who is constantly criticizing Israel; a man who always has something nasty to say about the Jewish people".

Statements on race

Central Park jogger case
In a 1989 column, Buchanan called for the public hanging in Central Park of a 16-year-old black teenager and the horsewhipping of four other younger African American and Hispanic teenagers for allegedly raping a white jogger in the Central Park Five case. He also called for the civilization of "barbarians" by putting the "fear of death" in them. Robert C. Smith, professor of political science at San Francisco State University, characterized the column as racist. The five teenagers were convicted, but their charges were later withdrawn, when in 2002 a man said he acted alone and DNA testing affirmed his guilt.

Personal life

Buchanan married White House staffer Shelley Ann Scarney in 1971. They had a tabby cat named Gipper, who reportedly sat on Buchanan's lap during staff meetings. Buchanan identifies as a traditionalist Catholic who attends Mass in the extraordinary form of the Roman Rite, and strongly defended Summorum Pontificum.

Electoral history

Publications

Books
.
.
.
.
.
.
.
Buchanan, Patrick J. (2006). State of Emergency: The Third World Invasion and Conquest of America. New York: Thomas Dunne Books,   . Full text available.
.
.
.
.
.

Major speeches
1992 Republican National Convention keynote, August 17, 1992
The Cultural War for the Soul of America, September 14, 1992
1996 campaign announcement, March 20, 1995
1996 campaign speech , Georgia primary stump speech February 29, 1996
Free Trade, Chicago Council on Foreign Relations speech November 18, 1998
2000 campaign announcement, March 2, 1999
A Time for Truth about China, Commonwealth Club speech April 5, 1999
To Reunite a Nation, Richard Nixon Library speech on immigration January 18, 2000
2000 Reform Party nomination acceptance, August 12, 2000
Death of The West, Commonwealth Club speech January 14, 2002

Selected articles
.
.
.
.
.
.
.
.
.
.
.
.
.
.
.
.

Interviews
.
.
.
.
.
Slen, Peter. In Depth with Pat Buchanan. C-SPAN, May 2, 2010.
.
.

In popular culture
 A fictional version of Buchanan appears in the 2009 film Watchmen, portrayed by James M. Connor.
 Buchanan appears as the final boss of the 1992 video game GayBlade.
 Buchanan was played by Phil Hartman in the Saturday Night Live parodies of The McLaughlin Group.

See also

 Christian right
 Constitution Party (United States)
 Culture war
 Non-interventionism
 Old Right (United States)
 Paleoconservatism
 Right-wing populism
 Protectionism
 White nationalism

References

Further reading

 Andryszewski, Tricia. The Reform Party: Ross Perot and Pat Buchanan (2000) online
 Davis, Mark. "‘Culture Is Inseparable from Race’: Culture Wars from Pat Buchanan to Milo Yiannopoulos." M/C Journal 21.5 (2018). online
 Lowndes, Joseph. "Populism and race in the United States from George Wallace to Donald Trump." in Routledge handbook of global populism (Routledge, 2018) pp. 190–200.
 Shapiro, Edward S. "Pat Buchanan and the Jews." Judaism: A Quarterly Journal of Jewish Life and Thought 45.2 (1996): 226-235. online
 Stanley, Timothy. The crusader: The life and tumultuous times of Pat Buchanan (Macmillan, 2012). online

External links

Patrick J. Buchanan at OpenLibrary
Patrick J. Buchanan at WorldCat

Archives

Patrick J. Buchanan Papers (White House Special Files) (1969-1972)
Works by Patrick J. Buchanan at Internet Archive
Works by Patrick J. Buchanan at LewRockwell.com
Works by Patrick J. Buchanan  at TheAmericanCause.org

|-

 
1938 births
Living people
20th-century American journalists
20th-century American male writers
20th-century American non-fiction writers
20th-century American politicians
20th-century Roman Catholics
21st-century American journalists
21st-century American male writers
21st-century American non-fiction writers
21st-century Roman Catholics
20th-century far-right politicians in the United States
Far-right politicians in the United States
Candidates in the 1992 United States presidential election
Candidates in the 1996 United States presidential election
Candidates in the 2000 United States presidential election
American columnists
American foreign policy writers
American male non-fiction writers
American Holocaust deniers
American male journalists
American magazine editors
American people of English descent
American people of German descent
American people of Irish descent
American people of Scottish descent
American political commentators
American political journalists
American political writers
American Roman Catholics
American traditionalist Catholics
American writers of Irish descent
Speechwriters for presidents of the United States
Anti-Zionism in the United States
Assistants to the President of the United States
Columbia University Graduate School of Journalism alumni
Male critics of feminism
Critics of multiculturalism
Critics of neoconservatism
Ford administration personnel
Georgetown College (Georgetown University) alumni
Gonzaga College High School alumni
Human Events people
Intelligent design advocates
Journalists from Washington, D.C.
MSNBC people
National Review people
Nixon administration personnel
Nixon administration personnel involved in the Watergate scandal
Non-interventionism
Old Right (United States)
American opinion journalists
Paleoconservatism
Right-wing populism in the United States
American anti–Iraq War activists
Reagan administration personnel
Reform Party of the United States of America presidential nominees
St. Louis Globe-Democrat people
Virginia Republicans
White House Communications Directors
Writers from Virginia
Writers from Washington, D.C.
Traditionalist Catholic writers
Columbia University alumni
Members of Sons of Confederate Veterans